Edgecomb is a town in Lincoln County, Maine, United States.

Edgecomb or Edgecombe may also refer to:


Places
 Edgecomb, Baltimore, Maryland
 Edgecombe County, North Carolina
 Fort Edgecomb, Maine

People
 Anthony Edgecomb, American politician
 Gregory Edgecombe, Canadian paleontologist
 Johnny Edgecombe, British musician and criminal
 Peter Edgecomb, American politician
 Reginald Edgecombe (1885–1966), British gymnast
 Richard Edgecombe (disambiguation), various British politicians

Other
 USS Edgecombe, a list of ships

See also
 Edgcumbe (disambiguation)
 Edgecumbe (disambiguation)